Dahab ("gold") is a small Egyptian town on the southeast coast of the Sinai Peninsula in Egypt, approximately  northeast of Sharm el-Sheikh. Formerly a Bedouin fishing village, Dahab is now considered to be one of Egypt's most treasured diving destinations. Following the Six-Day War, Sinai was occupied by Israel and Dahab became known as Di-Zahav, after a place mentioned in the Bible as one of the stations for the Israelites during the Exodus from Egypt. The Sinai Peninsula was restored to Egyptian rule under the Egypt–Israel peace treaty in 1982. Egypt's former president, Hosni Mubarak helped the arrival of many local and international tourism companies, hotel chains, and the establishment of many other ancillary facilities has since made the town resorts a popular destination with tourists. Dahab is served by Sharm el-Sheikh International Airport. Masbat (within Dahab) is a popular diving destination, and there are many (50+) dive centers located within Dahab. Most of Dahab's diving spots are shore dives.

Dahab can be divided into three major parts. Masbat, which includes the Bedouin village Asalah, is in the north. South of Masbat is Mashraba, which is more touristic and has considerably more hotels. In the southwest is Medina which includes the Laguna area, famous for its excellent shallow-water kite- and windsurfing.

The region of Asalah is quite developed and has many campsites and hostels. Most people who have visited Dahab in the past were backpackers interested in diving and snorkeling in the Red Sea. The town of Dahab counts around 15,000 inhabitants.

Tourism

Dahab attracts large numbers of tourists. It is world-renowned for its windsurfing. Reliable winds provide superb flat-water conditions inside Dahab's sand spit. Further away from shore, wavy conditions couple with strong winds to provide formidable conditions for keen windsurfers. However, in recent years, the lagoon inside the sand spit has been overtaken by kitesurfers, with two Russian-owned schools opening right on the beach. SCUBA diving, free-diving and snorkelling are also popular activities with many reefs immediately adjacent to waterfront hotels. The nearby Blue Hole (nicknamed "The World's Most Dangerous Diving Site") and Canyon are internationally famous dive spots. The increasing destruction of coral from reckless divers/dive centres diving is a pressing issue that is causing some worry, sparking the need to regulate dive centers more thoroughly.

Land-based activities include rock climbing, camel riding, horse riding, cycling, mountain biking trips, jeep and quad bike trips. Mount Sinai is a two-hours drive, with Saint Catherine's Monastery being a popular tourist destination.

Historically, most visitors to Dahab have been backpackers traveling independently and staying in hostels, motels, or guesthouses in the Masbat area. In recent years, the development of hotels in the Medina area has facilitated the arrival of a wider range of tourists, many of whom visit Dahab specifically to partake in surfing, windsurfing, diving, kite surfing, sailing, and other activities.

The word Dahab is Arabic for gold and is possibly a reference to the geographic locality; gold washed down from the desert mountains may have accumulated on the alluvial flood plain where the town was built. The name may also be a reference to the color of the sands to the south of the town itself. Some locals attribute the name to the colour of the sky just after sunset.

One local story concerning the town's name is that it stems from the floods that wash through the town every five or six years. Larger than average seasonal storms in the mountains cause a great rush of water to surge down to the sea, dragging with it great amounts of sand. During this time, the town is cut in two by the flood, the bay is stirred up and the sands turn it a golden yellow. This typically lasts a few days, and has caused damage and loss of life in the past as people were unaware of the sudden onset and the force the water moves at. Today, locals are ready when they see the clouds over the mountains.

According to the Bedouins of the area, however the name "Dahab" has a different origin. When the Bedouin people came there they called it "Waqaat Thahaab" (وقت ذهب) which translates literally as "Time Goes". This name derived from the fact that when you were there, you could easily lose track of time as the days would begin to run together. The name was then shortened to "Thahaab" (ذهب), but was misunderstood by travelers who thought they were saying Dahab.

Much of the coral in the reefs just offshore is slowly disappearing, due to inexperienced divers being taken out in large numbers. Another considerable problem is that in Masbat local restaurants are dumping sand and rock into the sea to extend the shoreline, again causing disruption to local coral reefs.

Local Bedouin children, sometimes encouraged by their families, come to beach cafes and restaurants to sell items such as woven bracelets to tourists.

Natural and tourist attractions 

The city has many of the most prominent attractions in Ras Abu Gallum, a nature reserve and a diving area. It is one of the world's most famous dive spots. The Kanoun region is one of the best diving areas in Al-Asala, a region where about 75% of the population of the city is divided into three areas (Mubarak City, Zarnouk, Al-Asala), Coral Island, and the remains of a historic fortress built by the Crusaders, Al-Mellil, a road parallel to the coast road, which includes some small hotels, cafeterias and houses, The main neighborhood of the city starts with Al Fanar Street and then Masbat Bay. It includes a wide range of shops, diving clubs, cafes, camps and hotels. It includes a large number of cafeterias and diving centers. It also includes the only impact there is Tel Mashraba. It is located in the old city of Dahab. The area of Wadi Qani, an area that represents the future urban expansion of the city because it includes a wide range of hotels, service and residential complexes, as well as the areas of Lighthouse and the Garden Garden and Oasis. Dahab comprises two gulfs, the Laguna or Ghazala, which is characterized by the city's only sandy beach and the city's cistern, as well as resorts along its shores that integrate with the surrounding nature with log-and-palm kiosks for tourists.

Climate 
Dahab has a hot desert climate (Köppen: BWh) as the rest of Egypt. Weather on summer days is very hot and also quite hot at night. Winter days are warm and nights are mild. Dahab has a very dry climate and rain is rare, even during the winter months. The precipitation peaks in February.

See also

 List of cities and towns in Egypt
 2006 Dahab bombings
 Red Sea Riviera

References

External links 

 

Populated coastal places in Egypt
Sinai Peninsula
Underwater diving sites in Egypt
Underwater diving resorts
Populated places in South Sinai Governorate
Tourism in Egypt
Seaside resorts in Egypt
Red Sea Riviera
Tourist attractions in Egypt